Gabriel "Gabe" Vilardi (born August 16, 1999) is a Canadian professional ice hockey centre currently playing for the  Los Angeles Kings of the National Hockey League (NHL). He was drafted eleventh overall by the Kings in the 2017 NHL Entry Draft.

Playing career
Vilardi was drafted in the first round, second overall, in the 2015 OHL Priority Selection by the Windsor Spitfires. While Vilardi is a natural centre he has primarily played as a winger with Windsor.

Leading up to the NHL draft, Vilardi was seen as a top prospect and was ranked the No. 4 North American skater by NHL Central Scouting Bureau. Craig Button of TSN described him as a big and strong centre with so much offensive upside.

In the 2017–18 season, on January 1, 2018, Vilardi along with Sean Day were traded by the Spitfires to the Kingston Frontenacs in exchange for Cody Morgan and six draft picks. On March 1, 2018, Vilardi signed a three-year entry-level contract with the Los Angeles Kings.

Due to a chronic back issue, Vilardi did not make his professional debut with Ontario Reign, the Kings American Hockey League affiliate, until November 29, 2018. He earned his first professional point three days later against the Tucson Roadrunners. On December 10, the Kings loaned Vilardi to Team Canada for a chance to compete at the 2019 World Junior Ice Hockey Championships.

Having recovered from his back issue, Vilardi found a more consistent spot with the Reign, playing 32 games in 2019–20, scoring 9 goals and 16 assists for 25 points. On February 20, 2020, Vilardi was recalled to the Kings from the Ontario Reign. He made his NHL debut later that night against the Florida Panthers. On his first career shot, Vilardi fired a wrist shot past Panthers goaltender Sergei Bobrovsky. Vilardi set a new NHL record, scoring his first career goal 6 seconds into his first career shift. Vilardi added an assist in the second period on a goal scored by Martin Frk.

As a restricted free agent, Vilardi was signed to a one-year, $825,000 contract extension with the Kings on July 23, 2022.

Personal life
Vilardi was born to Italian parents Natale Vilardi and Giovanna Siviglia who moved from Reggio Calabria to Kingston, Ontario. His older brother Francesco played three seasons in the Ontario Hockey League, and now plays for Queen's University hockey team.

Career statistics

Regular season and playoffs

International

References

External links
 
 

1999 births
Living people
Canadian ice hockey players
Canadian ice hockey centres
Canadian people of Italian descent
Ice hockey people from Ontario
Kingston Frontenacs players
Los Angeles Kings draft picks
Los Angeles Kings players
National Hockey League first-round draft picks
Ontario Reign (AHL) players
Sportspeople from Kingston, Ontario
Windsor Spitfires players